Paige Mary Hourigan (born 3 February 1997) is a professional tennis player from New Zealand. She has won four singles and eleven doubles titles on the ITF Circuit. She reached her best rankings in both singles and doubles after winning ITF titles in Singapore and Surprise, Arizona early in 2019, and those rankings continued to climb as her run of success extended through Mexico and Asia.

Junior career
Hourigan won five singles and five doubles titles as a junior, the best of which was the doubles at the Grade-2 Biesterbos Open in the Netherlands, partnering Lizette Cabrera. She twice competed in the Australian Open junior singles, her better result being a loss in the first round proper to Beatriz Haddad Maia in 2013. Her best junior ranking was 175, in October 2012.

Senior career
She made her WTA Tour debut at the 2013 Auckland Open. Her first main-draw win was in an ITF doubles match in Glen Iris, Australia, in April 2014, and her first ITF final resulted in a doubles win in Antalya, Turkey, in June 2016. She first represented New Zealand in the Fed Cup in Dushanbe, Tajikistan, in 2017, winning two of her three singles matches.

2018
Hourigan won her first singles title as a qualifier at Corroios (a suburb of Lisbon), Portugal, in July, just a few hours after being beaten in a qualifying match for her next tournament in neighbouring Setubal. Returning to North America, she then went all the way to the semifinals as a qualifier in an ITF tournament in Fort Worth, Texas. In December, she was runner-up to Valentina Ivanov in the singles at the New Zealand Tennis Championships, and won the doubles title with Erin Routliffe.

2019
Given a wildcard into the singles qualifying draw at the Auckland Open, Hourigan was again beaten by Valentina Ivanov, this time in the first round. She did much better in the doubles where, with partner Taylor Townsend, she got all the way to her first WTA final, having defeated second seeds Kirsten Flipkens and Johanna Larsson in the semifinal. Against the scratch pair of Eugenie Bouchard and Sofia Kenin, Hourigan and Townsend raced through the first set to lead 6–1, but lost the second set by the same score. The match tie-break was a scrappy affair, with Bouchard and Kenin eventually winning 10–7 to take the title.

Hourigan made no mistakes in her run to her second ITF doubles title, in Singapore three weeks later, this time with Indonesia's Aldila Sutjiadi as her partner. Beating the top seeds in their semifinal, they comfortably defeated the Hong Kong pair of Eudice Chong and Zhang Ling in the final, winning nine games in a row from 1–2 down in the first set on the way to a final score of 6–2, 6–3. Hourigan's third ITF doubles title came just three weeks later, in Surprise, Arizona, with star American youngster Coco Gauff on her side of the net. They started by beating the third seeds, Jovana Jakšić and Giuliana Olmos, and defeated the second seeds, Jacqueline Cako and Ingrid Neel, in an amazing semi-final, coming back from two set points down at 2–5, 30–40 to win five games in a row and take the first set. The second set was more straightforward, as they went on to win 7–5, 6–3. Less than an hour later they were back on court for the final, where they won the first set against Usue Maitane Arconada and Emina Bektas, but lost the second. The match tie-break saw the all-American pair work their way to a 9–5 lead, holding four match points. Hourigan and Gauff managed to save all four points to change ends again at 9-9, but then faced another match point, which they saved as well. They dropped their own first point again for match point number six, but recovered to level up at 11–11. They then lost a match point of their own before finally prevailing 14–12 after an epic 18 minute struggle.

On the Mexican swing of the ITF Circuit in March, she won the doubles title in Irapuato, and followed that with a runner-up finish in doubles and a win in the singles at the second tournament in Cancun, before taking the doubles title at the same venue a week later, after retiring during her singles semifinal earlier that day. That was followed by another title in Asia, as she reunited with Aldila Sutjiadi to make it two titles from two tournaments together by winning in Hong Kong.

Staying together for the next few tournaments, Hourigan and Sutjiadi lost to Rutuja Bhosale and Abigail Tere-Apisah in the semifinals of the first tournament in Singapore, beaten 14–12 in a match tie-break after holding two match points at 9–7. They made amends by winning the corresponding tournament the following week, beating Emily Appleton and Catherine Harrison in the final after Sutjiadi had thrashed Hourigan in their singles semifinal.  Their last tournament together was the following week in Hong Kong, where they were beaten in the semifinals by Tere-Apisah and Junri Namigata, in a match where several crucial line calls were disputed by one team or the other.

The next stop for Hourigan was the Fed Cup in Malaysia, where she had two double-bagel wins in singles before losing in three sets to Eudice Chong from Hong Kong. She played just one doubles match, teaming up with Erin Routliffe to beat the pair from Bangladesh. Moving on to Europe, Hourigan was injured in her first match in Spain before travelling to Portugal to try to defend her singles crown in Corroios. Well-beaten in the quarterfinals by Pemra Özgen, she and Alison Bai won the doubles title, beating Francisca Jorge and Olga Parres Azcoitia in a tight match tie-break in the final, winning 14–12 on their third match point, having saved two earlier in the tie-break. It was Hourigan's third doubles match of the season, and the second final, to feature the same score in the decider.

A family bereavement cut short Hourigan's European tour, and she didn't play again for nearly two months, resuming at Redding, California, in September. She and Catherine Harrison reached the doubles final, but they were well-beaten by Emina Bektas and Tara Moore. Four tournaments in Australia followed, the best resulting in another doubles final, where she and Bai lost to Destanee Aiava and Naiktha Bains in Brisbane. Two tournaments in Texas ended Hourigan's year, she and Katherine Sebov reaching the doubles semifinals in Dallas, but they had to default through injury.

2020
Hourigan began the new season in Auckland, where she received a wildcard into both singles and doubles, the latter with Sara Errani. She suffered a heavy defeat to Caroline Wozniacki in the first round of singles, and also lost in the first round of doubles. The next stop was an ITF tournament in Burnie, Tasmania, where she again lost in the first round of singles, this time after having to qualify, but made the semifinals of the doubles with Destanee Aiava.

Back in New Zealand, Hourigan won all three singles matches she played in the Fed Cup tournament in Wellington, ensuring New Zealand's place in the Asia/Oceania Zone Group I for 2021. Back in Australia, Hourigan lost in the first round of singles in both tournaments in Perth, Australia. She and Abigail Tere-Apisah lost in the quarterfinals of the first week's doubles event, but got through to the final in the second week, losing to Kanako Morisaki and Erika Sema.

From Perth, Hourigan flew to South Africa for two tournaments in Potchefstroom. In the first tournament she lost again in the first round of singles, but she and Berfu Cengiz were beaten in the doubles final by Samantha Murray Sharan and Fanny Stollár. Hourigan had reached the singles quarterfinal and doubles semifinal in the second week when the ITF Circuit events were suspended because of COVID-19. The only matches allowed to continue were those actually being played when the order to abandon was given.

Hourigan played just one tournament after the resumption of play in August, an ITF event in Sharm El Sheikh where she lost her doubles quarterfinal and had to withdraw from her singles quarterfinal when down 0–2 in the deciding set.

2021
Warming up for the new season with a series of exhibition matches in Auckland, Hourigan flew to Egypt in late March to resume her ITF career in Sharm El Sheikh. She had instant success, winning the singles title at the first tournament she entered, and keeping her unbeaten record in singles finals intact. Two weeks later, she won a doubles title at Monastir in Tunisia, and followed that with a singles title at the same venue.

WTA career finals

Doubles: 1 (runner-up)

ITF Circuit finals

Singles: 4 (4 titles)

Doubles: 18 (11 titles, 7 runner-ups)

 This tournament is an outdoor event, but rain caused the doubles final to be postponed from 13 April and then transferred to an indoor court.

Fed Cup participation

Singles (7–5)

Doubles (3–2)

Personal life 
Hourigan, who was born in Turakina, is of part Māori descent and affiliates to the Ngāti Tūwharetoa iwi.

References

External links
 
 
 

1997 births
Living people
People from Turakina
New Zealand female tennis players
Ngāti Tūwharetoa people
New Zealand Māori sportspeople
People educated at Nga Tawa Diocesan School